Lanka is the name given in Hindu epics to the island fortress capital of the legendary asura king Ravana in the epics of the Ramayana and the Mahabharata. The fortress was situated on a plateau between three mountain peaks known as the Trikuta Mountains. The ancient city of Lankapura is said to have been burnt down by Hanuman. After its king, Ravana was killed by Rama with the help of Ravana's brother Vibhishana, the latter was crowned king of Lankapura. His descendants were said to still rule the kingdom during the period of the Pandavas. According to the Mahabharata, the Pandava Sahadeva visited this kingdom during his southern military campaign for the rajasuya of Yudhishthira.

Ramayana 
The island was situated on a plateau between three mountain peaks known as the Trikuta Mountains. The ancient city of Lankapura is thought to have been burnt down by Hanuman. After its king, Ravana was killed by Rama with the help of Ravana's brother Vibhishana, the latter was crowned king of Lankapura. His descendants were said to still rule the kingdom during the period of the Pandavas. According to the Mahabharata, the Pandava Sahadeva visited this kingdom during his southern military campaign for the rajasuya of Yudhishthira.

Rulers of Lanka
According to both the Ramayana and the Mahabharata, Lanka was originally ruled by a rakshasa named Sumali. Kubera seized control of Lanka and established the Yaksha Kingdom and his capital was guarded by rakshasas. His half-brother Ravana, son of the sage Vishravaya and Sumali's daughter Kaikesi, fought with Kubera and took Lanka from him. Ravana ruled Lanka as king of the Rakshasa Kingdom. The battle in Lanka is depicted in a famous relief in the 12th-century Khmer temple of Angkor Wat.

After Ravana's death, he was succeeded by his brother, Vibhishana.

Location of Ravana's "Lanka" according to Ramayana
The Lanka referred to in the still-extant Hindu Texts and the Ramayana (referred to as Ravana's Lanka), is considered to be a large island-country, situated in the Indian Ocean. Studies refer that the Palace of Ravana was located in Sigiriya the palace built by the Kashyapa I of Anuradhapura as the legend describes the capital of the kingdom was located between plateaus and forests. Some scholars asserted that it must have been Sri Lanka because it is so stated in the 5th century Sri Lankan text Mahavamsa. However, the Ramayana clearly states that Ravana's Lanka was situated 100 Yojanas (roughly 1213 km or 753.72 miles) away from mainland India. Some scholars have interpreted the content of these texts to determine that Lanka was located at the point where the Prime-Meridian of India passes the Equator. The most original of all the existing versions of Valmiki's Ramayana also suggest the location of Ravana's Lanka to be in the western Indian Ocean. It indicates that Lanka was in the midst of a series of large island-nations, submerged mountains, and sunken plateaus in the western part of the Indian Ocean.

There has been a lot of speculation by several scholars since the 19th century that Ravana's Lanka might have been in the Indian Ocean around where the Maldives once stood as a high mountain, before getting submerged in the Indian Ocean.  Sumatra and Madagascar has also been suggested as a possibility.

Description

Ravana's Lanka, and its capital Lankapuri, are described in a manner that seems superhuman even by modern-day standards. Ravana's central palace complex (main citadel) was a massive collection of several edifices that reached over one yojana in height, one yojana in length, and half a yojana in breadth. The island had a large mountain range known as the Trikuta Mountain, atop which was situated Ravana's capital of Lanka, at the center of which in turn stood his citadel.

References to Lanka in the Mahabharata
Many of the references to Lanka in the Mahabharata are found in sage Markandeya's narration of the story of Rama and  Sita to the king Yudhishthira, which narration amounts to a truncated version of the Ramayana.  The references in the following summary are to the Mahabharata and adhere to the following form: (book:section). Markandeya's narration of the story begins at Book III (Varna Parva), Section 271 of the Mahabharata.

Sahadeva's expedition to South

Sahadeva, the son of Pandu, conquered the town of Sanjayanti and the country of the Pashandas and the Karanatakas utilizing his messengers alone and made all of them pay tributes to him. The hero brought under his subjection and exacted tributes from the Paundrayas (Pandyas?) and the Dravidas along with the Udrakeralas and the Andhras and the Talavanas, the Kalingas and the Ushtrakarnikas, and also the delightful city of Atavi and that of the Yavanas. And, He has arrived at the seashore, then dispatched with great assurance messengers unto the illustrious Vibhishana, the grandson of Pulastya and the ruler of Lanka (2:30).

Presence of the King of Lanka in Yudhishthira's Rajasuya
Lanka king is listed as present in the conclave of kings present in Pandava king Yudhishthira's Rajasuya sacrifice.

.. The Vangas and Angas and Paundras and Odras and Cholas and Dravidas and Cheras and Pandyas and Mushika and Andhakas, and the chiefs of many islands and countries on the seaboard as also of frontier states, including the rulers of the Sinhalas, the barbarous mlecchas, the natives of Lanka, and all the kings of the West by hundreds, and all the chiefs of the seacoast, and the kings of the Pahlavas and the Daradas and the various tribes of the Kiratas and Yavanas and Sakras and the Harahunas and Chinas and Tukharas and the Sindhavas and the Jagudas and the Ramathas and the Mundas and the inhabitants of the kingdom of women and the Tanganas and the Kekayas and the Malavas and the inhabitants of Kasmira ... (3:51).

Other fragmentary references

Lanka, with its warriors, and horses, elephants and chariots (3:149).
Lanka with its towers and ramparts and gates (3:147)
The walls of Lanka (3:282).

See also 
Sri Lanka
Mahajanapadas
Ancient clans of Lanka
Naga people
Sinhala Kingdom
Vishvakarma

References

External links
Mahabharata of Krishna Dwaipayana Vyasa, translated from Sanskrit into English by Kisari Mohan Ganguli

Kingdoms in the Ramayana
Kingdoms in the Mahabharata
Hindu mythology
Mythological islands